Vasiliy Kurilov (30 November 1947 – 12 November 2019) was a Soviet football midfielder and coach from Belarus.

References

External links
 Vasiliy Kurilov on footballfacts.ru
 Sarychev, V. Vasiliy Kurilov. pressball.by. 21 April 2005.

1947 births
2019 deaths
Sportspeople from Brest, Belarus
Soviet footballers
Association football midfielders
FC Dynamo Brest players
FC Dinamo Minsk players
FC Metalurh Zaporizhzhia players
NK Veres Rivne players
FC Vorskla Poltava players
Soviet football managers
Belarusian football managers
Belarusian expatriate football managers
Expatriate football managers in Ukraine
Belarusian expatriate sportspeople in Ukraine
FC Dynamo Brest managers
NK Veres Rivne managers
Ukrainian Premier League managers